

Function 
Human pregnancy-specific glycoproteins (PSGs) are a family of proteins that are synthesized in large quantities by the placental trophoblast and released into the maternal circulation during pregnancy. Molecular cloning and analysis of several PSG genes has shown that PSG forms a subset of the carcinoembryonic antigen (CEA) gene family that belongs to the immunoglobulin superfamily genes. Members of the CEA family consist of a single N domain that is structurally similar to the immunoglobulin variable domain, followed by a variable number of constant immunoglobulin-like A and / or B domains. Most PSGs have the Argglyasp (RGD) motif in the N-terminal domain. It has been shown to act as an adhesion recognition signal for some integrins.
Pregnancy-specific beta-1-glycoprotein 2 is a protein that in humans is encoded by the PSG2 gene.

References

Further reading